Romulea is a genus of flowering plants in the family Iridaceae, first described as a genus in 1772. It is distributed in Europe, the Mediterranean, the Arabian Peninsula, and Africa.

The genus name refers to the legendary founder of Rome, Romulus, and alludes to the abundance of one of the species in the Roman countryside.

 Species
 Romulea albiflora J.C.Manning & Goldblatt - Cape Province of South Africa
 Romulea albomarginata M.P.de Vos - Ceres Koue Bokkeveld in Cape Province of South Africa
 Romulea antiatlantica Maire - Morocco
 Romulea aquatica G.J.Lewis - Cape Province of South Africa
 Romulea arnaudii Moret - southeastern France
 Romulea atranda G.J.Lewis - Cape Province of South Africa
 Romulea austinii E.Phillips - Cape Province of South Africa
 Romulea autumnalis L.Bolus - Cape Province of South Africa
 Romulea barkerae M.P.de Vos - Cape Province of South Africa
 Romulea biflora (Bég.) M.P.de Vos - Cape Province of South Africa
 Romulea bifrons Pau - Morocco
 Romulea bocchierii Frignani & Iiriti - Sardinia
 Romulea bulbocodium  (L.) Sebast. & Mauri - Mediterranean region from Morocco + Portugal to Syria, Sudan
 Romulea camerooniana Baker - central + southern Africa north to Cameroon + Ethiopia
 Romulea cedarbergensis M.P.de Vos - Cedarberg in Cape Province of South Africa
 Romulea citrina Baker - Cape Province of South Africa
 Romulea clusiana  (Lange) Nyman - Morocco, Algeria, Spain, Portugal
 Romulea collina J.C.Manning & Goldblatt - Hantamsberg in Cape Province of South Africa
 Romulea columnae Sebast. & Mauri - Mediterranean region from Morocco + Portugal to Syria, Great Britain, Canary Islands, Madeira, Azores
 Romulea congoensis Bég. - Rwanda, Ethiopia, Kenya, Tanzania, Uganda 
 Romulea corsica Jord. & Fourr. - Corsica
 Romulea cruciata (Jacq.) Bég. - Cape Province of South Africa
 Romulea cyrenaica Bég. - Libya
 Romulea dichotoma (Thunb.) Baker - Cape Province of South Africa
 Romulea discifera J.C.Manning & Goldblatt - Cape Province of South Africa
 Romulea diversiformis M.P.de Vos - Sutherland in Cape Province of South Africa
 Romulea eburea J.C.Manning & Goldblatt - Roggeveld Escarpment in Cape Province of South Africa
 Romulea eburnea J.C.Manning & Goldblatt - Cape Province of South Africa
 Romulea elliptica M.P.de Vos - Cape Province of South Africa
 Romulea englerii Bég. - Morocco
 Romulea eximia M.P.de Vos - Cape Province of South Africa
 Romulea fibrosa M.P.de Vos - Cape Province of South Africa
 Romulea fischeri Pax - Kenya, Uganda, Ethiopia, Somalia, Eritrea, Socotra, Yemen, Saudi Arabia 
 Romulea flava  (Lam.) M.P.de Vos - Cape Province of South Africa; naturalized in Australia
 Romulea flexuosa Klatt - Cape Province of South Africa
 Romulea florentii Moret - southeastern France
 Romulea gigantea Bég. - Cape Province of South Africa
 Romulea gracillima Baker - Cape Province of South Africa
 Romulea hallii M.P.de Vos - Roggeveld Escarpment in Cape Province of South Africa
 Romulea hantamensis (Diels) Goldblatt - Hantamsberg in Cape Province of South Africa
 Romulea hirsuta (Steud. ex Klatt) Baker - Cape Province of South Africa
 Romulea hirta Schltr. - Cape Province of South Africa
 Romulea jugicola M.P.de Vos - Cape Province of South Africa
 Romulea kamisensis M.P.de Vos - Cape Province of South Africa
 Romulea komsbergensis M.P.de Vos - Roggeveld Escarpment in Cape Province of South Africa
 Romulea leipoldtii Marais - Cape Province of South Africa
 Romulea ligustica Parl. - Corsica, Sardinia, Veneto, Liguria, Algeria, Libya, Morocco, Tunisia 
 Romulea lilacina J.C.Manning & Goldblatt - Cape Province of South Africa
 Romulea × limbarae Bég. - Sardinia    (R. ligustica × R. requienii)
 Romulea linaresii Parl. - Sicily, Greece, Turkey, Tunisia 
 Romulea longipes Schltr. - Cape Province of South Africa
 Romulea lutea J.C.Manning & Goldblatt - Cape Province of South Africa
 Romulea luteiflora (M.P.de Vos) M.P.de Vos - Cape Province, Lesotho
 Romulea macowanii Baker - Cape Province, Free State, Lesotho
 Romulea maculata J.C.Manning & Goldblatt - Cape Province of South Africa
 Romulea malaniae M.P.de Vos - Cape Province of South Africa
 Romulea maroccana Bég. - Morocco
 Romulea melitensis Bég. - Malta, Gozo
 Romulea membranacea M.P.de Vos - near Middelpos in Cape Province of South Africa
 Romulea minutiflora Klatt - Cape Province; naturalized in Australia
 Romulea monadelpha  (Sweet ex Steud.) Baker - Cape Province of South Africa
 Romulea montana Schltr. ex Bég. - Cape Province of South Africa
 Romulea monticola M.P.de Vos - Cape Province of South Africa
 Romulea multifida M.P.de Vos  - Roggeveld Escarpment in Cape Province of South Africa
 Romulea multisulcata M.P.de Vos - Cape Province of South Africa
 Romulea namaquensis  M.P.de Vos - Cape Province of South Africa
 Romulea nivalis (Boiss. & Kotschy) Klatt - Mount Hermon in Syria + Lebanon
 Romulea numidica Jord. & Fourr. - Morocco, Algeria
 Romulea obscura Klatt - Cape Province; naturalized in Australia
 †Romulea papyracea Wolley-Dod - Cape Province but extinct
 Romulea pearsonii  M.P.de Vos - Cape Province of South Africa
 Romulea penzigii Bég. - Algeria
 Romulea petraea Al-Eisawi - Jordan
 Romulea phoenicia Mouterde - Lebanon, Syria, Jordan
 Romulea pilosa Goldblatt & J.C.Manning - Cape Province of South Africa
 Romulea pratensis M.P.de Vos - Cape Province of South Africa
 Romulea pudica (Sol. ex Ker Gawl.) Baker - Bokkeveld in Cape Province of South Africa
 Romulea quartzicola Goldblatt & J.C.Manning - Cape Province of South Africa
 Romulea ramiflora Ten. - Mediterranean from Morocco + Portugal to Turkey
 Romulea requienii Parl. - Corsica, Sardinia
 Romulea revelieri Jord. & Fourr. - Corsica, several small Italian islands in the Tyrrhenian Sea
 Romulea rosea (L.) Eckl. - Cape Province; naturalized in France, Chile, Australia, California, St. Helena, Tristan da Cunha
 Romulea rupestris J.C.Manning & Goldblatt - Cape Province of South Africa
 Romulea sabulosa Schltr. ex Bég. - Cape Province of South Africa
 Romulea saldanhensis M.P.de Vos - Cape Province of South Africa
 Romulea sanguinalis M.P.de Vos - Bokkeveld in Cape Province of South Africa
 Romulea saxatilis M.P.de Vos - Cape Province of South Africa
 Romulea schlechteri Bég. - Cape Province of South Africa
 Romulea setifolia N.E.Br. - Cape Province of South Africa
 Romulea singularis J.C.Manning & Goldblatt - Cape Province of South Africa
 Romulea sinispinosensis M.P.de Vos - Doringbaai in Cape Province of South Africa
 Romulea sladenii M.P.de Vos - Gifberg Plateau in Cape Province of South Africa
 Romulea speciosa (Ker Gawl.) Baker - Cape Province of South Africa
 Romulea sphaerocarpa M.P.de Vos - Great Karoo in Cape Province of South Africa
 Romulea stellata M.P.de Vos - Cape Province of South Africa
 Romulea sulphurea Bég - Pakhuis Mountains, Western Cape province of South Africa
 Romulea subfistulosa M.P.de Vos - Cape Province of South Africa
 Romulea syringodeoflora M.P.de Vos - Cape Province of South Africa
 Romulea tabularis Eckl. ex Bég. - Cape Province of South Africa
 Romulea tempskyana Freyn - Cyprus, Turkey, Greek Islands, Israel, Palestine
 Romulea tetragona M.P.de Vos - Cape Province of South Africa
 Romulea tortilis Baker - Cape Province of South Africa
 Romulea tortuosa (Licht. ex Roem. & Schult.) Baker - Cape Province of South Africa
 Romulea toximontana  M.P.de Vos - Cape Province of South Africa
 Romulea triflora (Burm.f.) N.E.Br.  - Cape Province of South Africa
 Romulea tubulosa J.C.Manning & Goldblatt - Cape Province of South Africa
 Romulea unifolia M.P.de Vos - Cape Province of South Africa
 Romulea vaillantii Quézel - Algeria
 Romulea villaretii Dobignard - Morocco
 Romulea vinacea M.P.de Vos - Pakhuis Pass in Cape Province of South Africa
 Romulea viridibracteata M.P.de Vos - Cape Province of South Africa
 Romulea vlokii M.P.de Vos - Cape Province of South Africa

References

Bibliography 

 

 
Iridaceae genera